Senjed (also known as Senjedi) is a village in Rabatat Rural District, Kharanaq District, Ardakan County, Yazd Province, Iran. At the 2006 census, its population was 59, in 24 families.

References 

Populated places in Ardakan County